A partial lunar eclipse took place on Tuesday, October 7, 1930.

Visibility

Related lunar eclipses

See also 
List of lunar eclipses and List of 21st-century lunar eclipses

External links 
 Saros series 116
 

1930-10
1930 in science